The women's 500 metres races of the 2014–15 ISU Speed Skating World Cup 7, arranged in the Gunda Niemann-Stirnemann-Halle in Erfurt, Germany, was held on the weekend of 21–22 March 2015.

Race 1
Race one took place on Saturday, 21 March, scheduled in the morning session, at 13:55.

Race 2
Race two took place on Sunday, 22 March, scheduled at 14:08.

References

Women 0500
7